Miss Universe 1996, the 45th Miss Universe pageant, was held on May 17, 1996 at Aladdin Theatre for the Performing Arts in Las Vegas, Nevada, United States. Alicia Machado of Venezuela was crowned by Chelsi Smith from the United States at the end of the event. 79 contestants competed in this edition.This is the second time that Las Vegas to host Miss Universe since 1991. She is the fourth Venezuelan woman to win Miss Universe following Maritza Sayalero in 1979, Irene Sáez in 1981, and Barbara Palacios in 1986.

The pageant originally was scheduled to be held in Johannesburg, South Africa. However, for financial reasons, South Africa couldn't host the pageant and Miss Universe was moved to Las Vegas.

This was the last time that the Miss Universe Franchise was run by ITT Corp.

Results

Placements

Order of announcements
Top 10

1. 

2. 

3. 

4. 

5. 

6. 

7. 

8. 

9. 

10. 

Top 6

1. 

2. 

3. 

4. 

5. 

6. 

Top 3

1. 

2. 

3.

Final competition

Preliminary Scores

Historical Relevance of Miss Universe 1996 

 For the second time Miss Universe is held in Las Vegas, Nevada, United States. The first time was in 1991. 
  wins its 4th crown at Miss Universe. The last time was in 1986 with Barbara Palacios.
  gets its highest placement ever, becoming First Runner Up. 
  obtains the position of Second Runner Up for the fifth time.
  places for its 20th consecutive year. 
  places for its 14th consecutive year.
  places for its 4th consecutive year.
  places for its 2nd consecutive year, becoming the first Central-American country to achieve this.
  hadn't placed since 1991.
  hadn't placed since 1994.
  hadn't placed since 1993.
  hadn't placed since 1987.
  places after 22 years. The last time was in 1974. 
  gets the second and third highest Evening Gown and Swimsuit Score respectively in Miss Universe history.
  gets the sixth highest Swimsuit Score in Miss Universe History. 
  gets the tenth highest Swimsuit Score in Miss Universe History. 
 Ilmira Shamsutdinova from   becomes the first representative from her country to win the Best National Costume. 
 Aillen Damiles from  becomes their third representative to win Miss Photogenic. The last time was in 1973. 
 Alicia Machado becomes the second Miss Universe to win Best in Swimsuit award. It only had happened in 1996. 
 Bon Goen hosts the event for his third consecutive year.

Contestants 

  - Verónica Ledezma
  - Taryn Mansell
  - Jodie McMullen
  - Michelle Rae Collie
  - Véronique De Kock
  - Ava Lovell
  - Natalia Cronenbold Aguilera
  - Jessy Viceisza
  - Maria Joana Parizotto
  - Linette Smith
  - Maria Sinigerova
  - Renette Cruz
  - Tasha Ebanks
  - Andrea L'Huillier Troncoso
  - Lina María Gaviria Forero
  - Victoria Keil
  - Dafne Zeledón Monge
  - Vanessa Dorinda Mambi
  - Froso Spyrou
  - Renata Hornofová
  - Anette Oldenborg
  - Sandra Natasha Abreu Matusevicius
  - Mónica Paulina Chalá Mejía
  - Hadeel Abol-Naga
  - Milena Mayorga
  - Helen Mahmastol
  - Lola Odusoga
  - Laure Belleville
  - Miriam Ruppert
  - Pearl Amoah
  - Anita St. Rose
  - Nina Georgala
  - Karla Hannelore Beteta Forkel
  - Yazmín Rossana Fiallos Bosak
  - Sofie Rahman
  - Andrea Deak
  - Hrafnhildur Hafsteinsdóttir
  - Sandhya Chib
  - Alya Rohali
  - Joanne Black
  - Liraz Mesilaty
  - Anna Valle
  - Trudi-Ann Ferguson
  - Kim Yoon-jung
  - Julia Syriani
  - Adeline Ong Siew Fong
  - Roseanne Farrugia
  - Vanessa Guzmán
  - Faghma Absolom
  - Marja de Graaf
  - Sarah Brady
  - Belvilyn Ada Tenorio
  - Inger Lise Ebeltoft
  - Reyna Royo
  - Marta Elizabeth Lovera Parquet
  - Natali Patricia Sacco Ángeles
  - Aileen Leng Marfori Damiles
  - Monika Chróścicka-Wnętrzak
  - Rita Carvalho
  - Sarybel Velilla Cabeza
  - Roberta Anastase
  - Ilmira Shamsutdinova
  - Angeline Putt
   - Iveta Jankulárová
  - Carol Anne Becker
  - María José Suárez Benítez
  - Shivanthini Dharmasiri
  - Annika Duckmark
  - Stéphanie Berger
  - Chen Hsiao-Fen
  - Nirachala Kumya
  - Michelle Kahn
  - Serpil Sevilay Ozturk
  - Shaneika Lightbourne
  - Irina Borisova
  - Adriana Sandra Maidana
  - Ali Landry
  - Alicia Machado Fajardo
  - Langa Sibanda

Order of Introduction
The following table is the order of introduction in the Parade of Nations segment in the regional groups, randomly-ordered. The order was fixed from 1994 but edited with more nations.

Notes

Replacements
  – Elmira Tuyusheva won Miss Russia 1995 and was supposed to compete in Miss Universe. However, she decided to break her contract with the Miss Russia organization just 1 month before Miss Universe to pursue her career as a model and actress. As none of the Miss Russia 1995 pageant runners-up were eligible to replace her duties due to several reasons, the organizers decided to pick Ilmira Shamsutdinova as the official delegate of Russia in Miss Universe 1996. Shamsutdinova was Miss USSR 1991 but the Soviet Union split into fifteen countries that year.

Withdrawals

  - Aileen Maravilla Villanueva
  - Miyuki Fujii
 
 
 
 
 
 
  - Alice Banda

Returns
Last competed in 1993:
 
 
Last competed in 1994:

Did not compete
  - Monique Chiara

Awards
  - Miss Congeniality (Jodie McMullen)
  - Miss Photogenic (Aileen Damiles)
  - Best National Costume (Ilmira Shamsutdinova)

General references

References

External links
 Miss Universe official website

1996
1996 in the United States
1996 beauty pageants
Beauty pageants in the United States
1996 in Nevada
Zappos Theater
May 1996 events in the United States